Vira Loucos (subtitled Cyro Baptista Plays the Music of Villa-Lobos) is an album by percussionist Cyro Baptista performing the compositions by or inspired by Heitor Villa-Lobos which was released on the Japanese Avant label in 1997.

Reception

In his review for Allmusic, Brian Olewnick notes that "Baptista has a assembled a group both light on its feet and capable of negotiating the trickiest of rhythmic passages and deliriously romantic melodies with wit, enthusiasm, and grace. Highly recommended".

Track listing
All compositions by Heitor Villa-Lobos except as indicated
 "Dansa" – 3:33   
 "Passion in the Basement" (Cyro Baptista, Naná Vasconcelos) – 3:31   
 "Cantiga" – 5:47   
 "Ama/Teresinha de Jesus" (Baptista) – 4:52   
 "Complaint/Sabia" (Baptista/Hervé Cordovil) – 3:15   
 "Choro/Trrenzinho Caipira" – 6:40   
 "Choros Number 8" – 3:51   
 "Dansa Do Indio Branco" – 3:31   
 "Ciranda" (Baptista) – 5:09   
 "Sapo Cururu" (Baptista) – 5:02

Personnel
Cyro Baptista – percussion, vocals
Greg Cohen – bass  
Romero Lubambo – cavaquinho acoustic guitar  
Marc Ribot – electric guitar acoustic guitar, banjo    
John Zorn – alto saxophone (tracks 1 & 10)  
Vanessa Fallabella (tracks 1 & 5), Naná Vasconcelos (track 2) – vocals
Chango Spasiuk – cantiga accordion (track 3) 
Akiko Matsumoto, Alessandro Ciari, Carolina Teizeria, Healey Gabison, Kaleb Moreau, Lauren Melquiond, Lira Teizeria, Moran Broza, Roman Broza, Sabina Ciari, Stepanie Teixeira, Tessa Fernandes – children's choir (track 10)

References

Avant Records albums
Cyro Baptista albums
1997 albums
Albums produced by John Zorn